Aappilattoq may refer to the following places in Greenland:

Islands 
 Aappilattoq Island (Tasiusaq Bay), an uninhabited island in the Upernavik Archipelago in northwestern Greenland
 Aappilattoq Island (Upernavik Icefjord), an island in the Upernavik Archipelago in northwestern Greenland, home to the settlement of Aappilattoq, Avannaata

Settlements 
 Aappilattoq, Kujalleq, a settlement in the Kujalleq municipality in southern Greenland
 Aappilattoq, Avannaata, a settlement in the Avannaata municipality in northwestern Greenland